Dalla quasca is a species of butterfly in the family Hesperiidae. It is found in Colombia and Ecuador.

Subspecies
Dalla quasca quasca - Colombia
Dalla quasca equatoria Bell, 1947 - Ecuador

References

Butterflies described in 1947
quasca